Ajak Deng (born 7 December 1989) is a South Sudanese-Australian model.

Early life
Deng was born in what is now known as South Sudan. Her family became refugees in Kenya before moving to Melbourne, Australia in 2005 due to the civil war in South Sudan. At the age of 11, the Australian government accepted her after her mother died of malaria. She has 7 siblings.

Career
Her first international modeling jobs included an advertisement for United Colors of Benetton and fashion shows for Valentino, Lanvin, Givenchy, Chloé, Maison Martin Margiela, Dior, Jean-Paul Gaultier, Oscar de la Renta, Alexander Wang, and Marc by Marc Jacobs. She has also modeled for Calvin Klein, Levi’s, Louis Vuitton, Gap, Inc., Nine West, Kate Spade, MAC Cosmetics, Kenzo, Topshop, Rick Owens, Thom Browne, Jason Wu, Hermès, Belstaff, Emilio Pucci, Sally Hansen, Thakoon, and Valentino.

Deng briefly quit modeling in 2016.

She auditioned for the role of a Bond girl but was told she was "too pretty" for it.

Since 2018, she has been one of the faces of Fenty Beauty.

References 

Living people
1989 births
Australian female models
South Sudanese female models
Sudanese refugees
Sudanese emigrants to Australia
IMG Models models
Australian people of Sudanese descent
Australian models of South Sudanese descent